Spanish Peaks Airfield  is 5 miles north of Walsenburg in Huerfano County, Colorado, United States. It is owned by Huerfano County, and is named for the Spanish Peaks.

The airport is 2 miles (3 km) east of Interstate 25 via a gravel road, but taxiways are paved. The airport is near the junction of Interstate 25 (concurrent with U.S. Highway 85 and U.S. Highway 87), Highway 10, Highway 69, and U.S. Highway 160.

Facilities
Spanish Peaks Airfield covers 80 acres and has two runways:

 8/26: 4,896 x 60 ft (1,492 x 18 m): asphalt
 3/21: 2,500 x 40 ft (762 x 12 m): grass/dirt

In the year ending August 16, 2008 the airport had 3,500 aircraft operations, average about 10 per day: 70% general aviation local, 30% general aviation transient, and no military. 13 aircraft are based at the airport: 12 single engine and 1 multi-engine.

References

External links 
Huerfano County (Spanish Peaks) Airport
Spanish Peaks Airfield at Colorado DOT website

Airports in Colorado
Buildings and structures in Huerfano County, Colorado
Transportation in Huerfano County, Colorado